The Radio Tycoon (播音人) is a 1983 Hong Kong television drama produced by TVB and starring Chow Yun-fat, Angie Chiu and Michael Miu

Music
The theme song, entitled Only Love You (愛定你一個) was composed and arranged by Joseph Koo, with lyrics provided by Wong Jim. The song was performed by popular Macau singer of the time Jenny Tseng.

Synopsis
Wai Yip-cheung (Chow Yun-fat) returned from the United Kingdom to Hong Kong as a lawyer. Instead of pursuing the law profession like his family wants, he got a job as a radio DJ at a local HK radio station.  Lui Hei (Michael Miu), the young and inexperienced young friend of Wai tries to get a job at the station. He soon falls in love with Au Yeuk-chi (Angie Chiu), who seems to be only paying attention to Wai.  He now wants a job more than ever at the station, but many guys were also interested in her. The story revolves around the rather gossipy late-1970s radio station life and work. The story also feature a few sub plots.

Cast

See also
 Air wave novel

References

TVB dramas
1983 Hong Kong television series debuts
1983 Hong Kong television series endings
Serial drama television series
Television series about radio
1980s Hong Kong television series
Cantonese-language television shows